A friction hitch is a kind of knot used to attach one rope to another in a way that is easily adjusted.  These knots are commonly used in climbing as part of single-rope technique, doubled-rope technique and as "ratchets" to capture progress on a moving rope, most typically in a mechanical advantage system such as a Z-drag.  These hitches are a simple and cheap alternative to mechanical ascenders.

List of friction hitches

See also
List of hitch knots
List of knots

References 

Son of a Hitch: A Genealogy of Arborists’ Climbing Hitches

External links
Climber's Friction Hitch Line up

Hitch knots
Climbing knots